Mariano Roca de Togores y Carrasco, 1st Marquess of Molins Grandee of Spain and 1st Viscount of Rocamora (17 August 1812, in Albacete, Spain – 4 September 1889, in Lequeitio, Biscay, Spain) was a Spanish noble, politician and writer who served as Minister of State during the reign of Alfonso XII.  His title takes its name from the locality of Molins, Orihuela.

|-

Marquesses of Spain
Viscounts of Spain
Members of the Royal Spanish Academy
Knights of the Golden Fleece
Foreign ministers of Spain
1812 births
1889 deaths
Conservative Party (Spain) politicians
Grandees of Spain
Ambassadors of Spain to the United Kingdom of Great Britain and Ireland